The Alfa Romeo Montreal is a 2+2 coupé sports car produced by the Italian manufacturer Alfa Romeo from 1970 to 1977.

Concept car

The Alfa Romeo Montreal was introduced as a concept car in 1967 at Expo 67, held in Montreal, Quebec, Canada. Originally, the concept cars were displayed without any model name, but the public took to calling it The Montreal. It was a 2+2 coupe using the 1.6-litre engine of the Alfa Romeo Giulia TI and the short wheelbase chassis of the Alfa Romeo Giulia Sprint GT, with a body designed by Marcello Gandini at Bertone.
One of the two concept cars built for Expo 67 is displayed in the Alfa Romeo Historical Museum in Arese, Italy, while the other is in museum storage.

Production version

This engine was derived from the 2-litre V8 used in the 33 Stradale and in the Tipo 33 sports prototype racer. The chassis and running gear of the production Montreal were taken from the Giulia GTV coupé and comprised double wishbone suspension with coil springs and dampers at the front and a live axle with limited slip differential at the rear.

Since the concept car was already unofficially known as The Montreal, Alfa Romeo kept the model name in production.

Stylistically, the most eye catching feature is the car's front end with four headlamps partly covered by unusual "grilles", that retract when the lights are switched on (a compromise Gandini had to make to meet regulations for the height of headlamps in certain markets). Another stylistic element is the NACA duct on the bonnet. The duct is actually blocked off since its purpose is not to draw air into the engine, but to optically hide the power bulge. The slats behind the doors contain the cabin vents, but apart from that only serve cosmetic purposes. Paolo Martin is credited for the prototype instrument cluster.

The Montreal was more expensive to buy than the Jaguar E-Type or the Porsche 911.

Production

Production was split between the Alfa Romeo plant in Arese and Carrozzeria Bertone's plants in Caselle and Grugliasco outside Turin. Alfa Romeo produced the chassis and engine and mechanicals and sent the chassis to Caselle where Bertone fitted the body. After body fitment, the car was sent to Grugliasco to be degreased, partly zinc coated, manually spray painted and have the interior fitted. Finally, the car was returned to Arese to have the engine and mechanicals installed. It is worth noting that because of this production method, there is not necessarily any correspondence between chassis number, engine number and production date.

The Montreal remained generally unchanged until it was finally removed from pricelists in 1977. By then, production had long ceased as Alfa struggled to sell their remaining stock. Total production was around 3,900. 

None of them were sold in Montréal since Alfa did not develop a North American version to meet the emission control requirements which applied in the United States and Canada.

Autodelta Montreal Group 4 '72
Autodelta completed late in 1972 a Group 4 Montreal. It was launched at the London Racing Car Show in January 1973. It was sold to Alfa Romeo Germany to be used in the DRM series for GT cars. Ready to race in May 1973, the car was entrusted to specialist racing team of Dieter Gleich, who was also the principle driver. Without any further development the car was outdated very soon. A Montreal was also campaigned in the United States but also without success.

Performance and specifications

See also
 Alfa Romeo 33 Stradale

References

External links

 The Alfa Romeo Montreal Website
 Classic Motorsports magazine Alfa Romeo Montreal buyer's guide

Montreal
Bertone concept vehicles
Bertone vehicles
Rear-wheel-drive vehicles
Coupés
2+2 coupés
Group 4 (racing) cars
Cars introduced in 1967
Cars introduced in 1970
Expo 67
Grand tourers
Cars discontinued in 1977